Mitch Thomas Keller (born April 4, 1996) is an American professional baseball pitcher for the Pittsburgh Pirates of Major League Baseball (MLB).

Amateur career
Keller was drafted by the Pittsburgh Pirates in the second round of the 2014 Major League Baseball draft out of Xavier High School in Cedar Rapids, Iowa. He signed with the Pirates on June 14, 2014 for a signing bonus worth $1,000,000. He had been committed to play college baseball for the North Carolina Tar Heels.

Professional career
Keller made his professional debut with the Gulf Coast League Pirates, where he spent all of 2014, pitching to a 1.98 ERA in  innings. Keller spent 2015 with the Bristol Pirates, posting a 0–3 record with a 5.49 ERA in six starts. He spent 2016 with the West Virginia Power where he was 8–5 with a 2.46 ERA in 23 starts. He also pitched in one game for the Bradenton Marauders at the end of the season.

In 2017, Keller began the season with Bradenton. After going 6–3 with a 3.14 ERA in 15 starts, he was promoted to the Altoona Curve in August and finished the season there with a 2–2 record and 3.12 ERA in six starts. MLB.com ranked Keller as Pittsburgh's top prospect going into the 2018 season. He began the season with Altoona and was promoted to the Indianapolis Indians during the season. He also pitched in one game for Bradenton during the season. In 25 starts between the three clubs, he went 12–4 with a 3.48 ERA. The Pirates added him to their 40-man roster after the season.

Keller began 2019 with Indianapolis. He was promoted to the major leagues on May 26, and he made his major league debut at Great American Ball Park versus the Cincinnati Reds, giving up six earned runs over four innings, walking two and striking out seven. He would finish the season with a 7.13 ERA over 12 starts and 48 innings pitched. 

In the shortened 2020 season, Keller registered a 2.91 ERA with 16 strikeouts in  innings of work over 5 starts for the Pirates.

In 2021 he went 5–11 with a 6.17 ERA and 92 strikeouts in  innings. It would stand as the 3rd worst ERA among pitchers with a minimum of 100 innings pitched in 2021. 

To start the 2022 season, Keller gave up a 6.61 ERA in  innings of work. However, after adding a sinker to his mix, Keller would go on to throw for 3.21 ERA and 3.67 FIP across his remaining  innings. Keller gave up the 703rd and final home run to Albert Pujols on October 4, 2022. In total, Keller pitched to an ERA of 3.91, striking out 138 batters, to go along with a Wins Above Replacement value of 2.1 over 159 innings during the 2022 season.

On January 13, 2023, Keller agreed to a one-year, $2.4375 million contract with the Pirates, avoiding salary arbitration.

Personal
Keller and his wife Clancy married in 2020. His brother, Jon Keller, played in the Baltimore Orioles organization.

References

External links

1996 births
Living people
Sportspeople from Cedar Rapids, Iowa
Baseball players from Iowa
Major League Baseball pitchers
Pittsburgh Pirates players
Gulf Coast Pirates players
Bristol Pirates players
West Virginia Power players
Bradenton Marauders players
West Virginia Black Bears players
Altoona Curve players
Indianapolis Indians players
Glendale Desert Dogs players